The Venoge is a Swiss river located in the canton of Vaud, a tributary of the Rhône, via Lake Geneva. The Swiss poet Jean Villard Gilles wrote a poem about it, La Venoge, in 1954.

Geography 

The Venoge has its source at L'Isle in the canton of Vaud and flows 44 km down to Lake Geneva, by Saint-Sulpice.

Course
Between its source in L'Isle and Lake Geneva, la Venoge runs through Cuarnens, La Chaux, Moiry, Chevilly, Ferreyres, La Sarraz, Éclépens, Lussery-Villars, Daillens, Cossonay, Penthalaz, Penthaz, Gollion, Vufflens-la-Ville, Aclens, Bussigny-près-Lausanne, Bremblens, Échandens, Écublens, Denges, Préverenges to finally reach Saint-Sulpice.

Tributaries
 Le Veyron
 La Molombe
 La Senoge

History
The Venoge was called Venobia in 814, Venubia in 937, Vinogia in 7th century, Venopia in 1313 and Venogy in 1316. Its name is probably of Celtic origin.

In 1913 it was described as splitting at La Sarraz, with the smaller part joining to the Mozon, which flows into Lake Neuchâtel at Yverdon-les-Bains, and the main part turning to the south and flowing into Lake Geneva east of Morges.

The river has been subject to heavy pollution during the 20th century. The building of more and better sewage plants along its course has led to an improvement since 1990.

See also 
 "vue satellite de l'embouchure de la Venoge" on WikiMapia
 "Protection de la Venoge"
 La Venoge by Jean Villard Gilles

References

Rivers of Switzerland
Rivers of the canton of Vaud
Rivers of the Jura